Adam Davies is an American author born in 1971 in Louisville, Kentucky.

Davies first appeared in print with The Frog King in 2002, and followed with Goodbye Lemon (2006), and Mine All Mine (2008). The last novel mentions the theft of the Cellini Salt Cellar in Vienna in 2003.

Bibliography

Novels
 The Frog King, 
 Goodbye Lemon, Riverhead Trade; 1 edition (August 1, 2006), 
 Mine All Mine, Riverhead Trade; 1 edition (August 5, 2008),

Magazine articles
 "The Kate I Knew", Sarasota Magazine, July 1, 2011.

Living people
American male novelists
Writers from Louisville, Kentucky
Writers from Savannah, Georgia
21st-century American novelists
21st-century American male writers
Novelists from Kentucky
Novelists from Georgia (U.S. state)
1971 births
Loomis Chaffee School alumni